Pearse's mudskipper (Periophthalmus novemradiatus) is a species of mudskippers native to marine and brackish waters along the coasts of the Bay of Bengal.  This species is amphibious, dwelling in intertidal areas.  It can reach a length of  SL.

References 

Pearse's mudskipper
Fish of Bangladesh
Fish of India
Fish of Malaysia
Fish of the Indian Ocean
Pearse's mudskipper